HyperCad 54, Where Are You? is a collection of adventures published by Avalon Hill in 1992 for the humorous science fiction role-playing game Tales From the Floating Vagabond.

Description
HyperCad 54, Where Are You? is a set of five adventure scenarios involving agents of the Time Police: 
 The Return of the King
 Raiders of the Lost Part
 The Tragical History Tour
 Imprisonered
 Attack of the 50' Filksinger

The book also contains a description of the Time Police, as well as character sheets and player handouts.

Publication history
Avalon Hill published Tales from the Floating Vagabond in 1991. The following year they published HyperCad 54, Where Are You, a 92-page softcover book of adventures designed by Craig Sheeley, with additional material by Phil Morrissey, interior art by Vicky Wyman, cartography by Dave Dobyski, and cover art by Jim Holloway.

Reception
In the March 1993 edition of Dragon (Issue 191), Rick Swan admitted he was not a fan of the original Tales from the Floating Vagabond game, commenting that it "generated more groans than belly laughs, not a good sign from an RPG that lives and dies on the strength of its jokes." But he was pleasantly surprised by this book, saying, "the HyperCad supplement gets it right, collecting five delightfully goofy scenarios." Although Swan liked the high production values, he concluded "It's Craig Sheeley's nimble writing that makes HyperCad a keeper."

Other reviews
White Wolf (Issue 41 - Feb 1994)

References

Role-playing game adventures
Role-playing game supplements introduced in 1992